Finne is a municipality in the Burgenlandkreis district, in Saxony-Anhalt, Germany. It was formed by the merger of the previously independent municipalities Billroda and Lossa, on 1 July 2009. It was named after the Finne, a range of low hills situated between Heldrungen and Bad Sulza.

References

Burgenlandkreis